In thermodynamics, the enthalpy of fusion of a substance, also known as (latent) heat of fusion, is the change in its enthalpy resulting from providing energy, typically heat, to a specific quantity of the substance to change its state from a solid to a liquid, at constant pressure.

It is the amount of energy required to convert one mole of solid into liquid. For example, when melting 1 kg of ice (at 0 °C under a wide range of pressures), 333.55 kJ of energy is absorbed with no temperature change. The heat of solidification (when a substance changes from liquid to solid) is equal and opposite.

This energy includes the contribution required to make room for any associated change in volume by displacing its environment against ambient pressure. The temperature at which the phase transition occurs is the melting point or the freezing point, according to context. By convention, the pressure is assumed to be  unless otherwise specified.

Overview
The 'enthalpy' of fusion is a latent heat, because, while melting, the heat energy needed to change the substance from solid to liquid at atmospheric pressure is latent heat of fusion, as the temperature remains constant during the process. The latent heat of fusion is the enthalpy change of any amount of substance when it melts. When the heat of fusion is referenced to a unit of mass, it is usually called the specific heat of fusion, while the molar heat of fusion refers to the enthalpy change per amount of substance in moles.

The liquid phase has a higher internal energy than the solid phase. This means energy must be supplied to a solid in order to melt it and energy is released from a liquid when it freezes, because the molecules in the liquid experience weaker intermolecular forces and so have a higher potential energy (a kind of bond-dissociation energy for intermolecular forces).

When liquid water is cooled, its temperature falls steadily until it drops just below the line of freezing point at 0 °C. The temperature then remains constant at the freezing point while the water crystallizes. Once the water is completely frozen, its temperature continues to fall.

The enthalpy of fusion is almost always a positive quantity; helium is the only known exception. Helium-3 has a negative enthalpy of fusion at temperatures below 0.3 K. Helium-4 also has a very slightly negative enthalpy of fusion below . This means that, at appropriate constant pressures, these substances freeze with the addition of heat.

These values are mostly from the CRC Handbook of Chemistry and Physics, 62nd edition. The conversion between cal/g and J/g in the above table uses the thermochemical calorie (calth) = 4.184 joules rather than the International Steam Table calorie (calINT) = 4.1868 joules.

Examples

Solubility prediction
The heat of fusion can also be used to predict solubility for solids in liquids. Provided an ideal solution is obtained the mole fraction  of solute at saturation is a function of the heat of fusion, the melting point of the solid  and the temperature  of the solution:

Here,  is the gas constant. For example, the solubility of paracetamol in water at 298 K is predicted to be:

which is a deviation from the real solubility (240 g/L) of 11%. This error can be reduced when an additional heat capacity parameter is taken into account.

Proof
At equilibrium the chemical potentials for the solute in the solution and pure solid are identical:

or

with  the gas constant and  the temperature.

Rearranging gives:

and since

the heat of fusion being the difference in chemical potential between the pure liquid and the pure solid, it follows that

Application of the Gibbs–Helmholtz equation:

ultimately gives:

or:

and with integration:

the end result is obtained:

See also
 Enthalpy of vaporization
 Heat capacity
 Thermodynamic databases for pure substances
 Joback method (Estimation of the heat of fusion from molecular structure)
 Latent heat
 Lattice energy
 Heat of dilution

Notes

References

Thermodynamic properties
Enthalpy